Gehyra pulingka (occasionally referred to as the rock-dwelling dtella, and more rarely the Umuwa spotted dtella) is a species of gecko endemic to Australia. It occurs in north-west South Australia, the mid Northern Territory, and Western Australia to the eastern Rawlinson Ranges. It is described as being generally dark-skinned with a pattern of light and dark markings over its body; however, light-skinned variants with similar patterns have been found.

Etymology 
The species name comes from the Pitjantjatjara language, from the words puli, meaning 'rock' or 'hill', and the suffix of ngka, meaning 'of', or 'pertaining to'.

References

Gehyra
Geckos of Australia
Endemic fauna of Australia
Reptiles described in 2014
Taxa named by Steve Donnellan (scientist)
Taxa named by Mark Norman Hutchinson